Merocoris is a genus of leaf-footed bugs in the family Coreidae. There are about eight described species in Merocoris.

Species
These eight species belong to the genus Merocoris:
 Merocoris bergi Mayr, 1879
 Merocoris curtatus Mcatee, 1919
 Merocoris distinctus Dallas, 1852
 Merocoris elevatus (Spinola, 1837)
 Merocoris lugubris Perty, 1833
 Merocoris tristis Perty, 1833
 Merocoris tumulus Brailovsky & Barrera, 2009
 Merocoris typhaeus (Fabricius, 1798)

References

Further reading

 

Coreidae genera
Meropachyinae